The third USS Northampton (CLC-1/CC-1) was a US Navy command light cruiser (command ship). She was laid down as an  heavy cruiser (CA–125), on 31 August 1944 by the Fore River Yard, Bethlehem Steel Corp., Quincy, Massachusetts. Work suspended between 11 August 1945 and 1 July 1948; she was launched as CLC–1, on 27 January 1951; sponsored by Mrs. Edmond J. Lampron; and commissioned as CLC–1, on 7 March 1953.

History 
Following shakedown, Northampton reported for duty to Commander Operational Development Forces, Atlantic Fleet. For seven months she conducted extensive tests of her new equipment. Evaluation completed in September 1954 and she reverted to the operational control of Commander Battleship Cruiser Force, Atlantic Fleet. She next demonstrated her capabilities as a tactical Command Ship by serving as flagship, first for Commander Amphibious Force, Atlantic Fleet (October–November 1954) and then for Commander 6th Fleet (December 1954–March 1955). Between 1 September and 22 October she served as flagship for Commander Strike Force, Atlantic, a position she was to hold frequently over the next fifteen years.

On 24 February 1956, Northampton emerged from her first overhaul at the Norfolk Naval Shipyard, Portsmouth, Virginia, and, after refresher training off Cuba, participated as a unit of the Navy’s first guided missile division afloat, CruDiv 6, in the first public demonstration of the Terrier missile. In April, she steamed east for six months with the 6th Fleet, and, during the summer of 1957, resumed midshipmen training cruises. However, between that time and 1961, she infrequently returned to European waters. Deployed on occasion for NATO and fleet exercises and People to People visits, the command ship was visited by high government officials of various European countries, including Kings Baudouin of Belgium and Olav V of Norway.

Decommissioning 
Redesignated CC–1 on 15 April 1961, Northampton remained in the western Atlantic until decommissioning in February 1970. Her cruises ranged from Canadian to Panamanian waters as she extensively tested and evaluated new communications equipment and played host to visiting national and international dignitaries, including Presidents John F. Kennedy and Lyndon B. Johnson. The ship was eventually withdrawn from service, and was stricken from the Naval Vessel Register on 31 December 1977 during the Carter Administration.

Other roles
Besides acting as a fleet command ship, Northampton was planned for or actually functioned in at least two other roles.

Pilotfish
When the first supercarrier USS United States (CVA-58) was being designed, it was thought she would not be able to have an island or masts for radar or other antennas. Therefore the Northampton was seen as a 'pilotfish', a ship that would escort the carrier and act not only as a radar picket (although from the center of the task force rather than the periphery as a true picket would), but also as the radar director of aircraft approach and landing on the carrier. The recent invention of the angled flight deck made it possible to install islands and radar on supercarriers, and so this role was eliminated from the Northampton.

"Floating White House"

According to a Washington Post article on 29 July 2006, Northampton was part of the U.S. government's plan for Continuity of Operations and reported to be a "floating White House" to which the President could be evacuated in the event of nuclear attack.  As such she was designated as the National Emergency Command Post Afloat (NECPA); Northampton was one of two ships to serve in the role, with the other being the aircraft carrier . The ship was modified with an extra deck, the tallest communications mast in the Navy and multi-link communications gear.

Gallery

Awards
Navy Expeditionary Medal 
National Defense Service Medal with 2 awards

See also 
USS Saipan (CVL-48)
USS Wright (CVL-49)

References

Notes

Sources
 
 "A White House Physician" by James Young, M.D., in Our White House: Looking In, Looking Out (Candlewick Press 2008)
 http://www.globalsecurity.org/military/systems/ship/clc-1.htm

External links

 

 

Oregon City-class cruisers
Cruisers of the United States Navy
Cold War cruisers of the United States
Ships built in Quincy, Massachusetts
1951 ships
Decommissioned command ships of the United States Navy
Continuity of government in the United States